Bo Finnhammar (born 5 June 1933) is a retired Swedish footballer. Finnhammar made 18 Allsvenskan appearances for Djurgården and scored 10 goals.

References

Swedish footballers
Allsvenskan players
Djurgårdens IF Fotboll players
1933 births
Living people
Association footballers not categorized by position